As the Bell Rings, is the Singapore version of As the Bell Rings. It is currently on the Disney Channel Xtra Mobile. It is a Singapore adaption of the Disney Channel Italy Original Series Quelli dell'intervallo.

Cast
 Col.Zac/Mega Fighter: Dylan Loh
 ACP Elizabeth/Mega Crusader: Nicole Joy Tan
 Jamie/Mega Ninja: Chia Zhong Han
 Jackie Chen/Mega Warrior: Duane Russell Ho An
 Tan Ying Ying/Mega Queen Victoria Lim
 Wee Chong/Mega Deck: Wong Renjie
 Aziz Maidin/Mega King: Farez Bin Juraimi
 Maisy/Mega Ace: Deborah Arunditha Emmanuel

References

Disney Channels Worldwide original programming
Singaporean television series
2000s high school television series
2000s teen sitcoms
Television series about teenagers